Majidae is a family of crabs, comprising around 200 marine species inside 52 genera, with a carapace that is longer than it is broad, and which forms a point at the front. The legs can be very long in some species, leading to the name "spider crab". The exoskeleton is covered with bristles to which the crab attaches algae and other items to act as camouflage.

Genera
The roughly 200 extant and over 50 extinct species are divided among 52 genera in 5 subfamilies:

Eurynolambrinae Števčić, 1994
Eurynolambrus H. Milne-Edwards & Lucas, 1841
Majinae Samouelle, 1819
Ageitomaia Griffin & Tranter, 1986
Anacinetops Miers, 1879
Choniognathus Rathbun, 1932
Cyclax Dana, 1851
Entomonyx Miers, 1884
Eurynome Leach, 1814
Jacquinotia Rathbun, 1915
Kasagia Richer de Forges & Ng, 2007
Kimbla Griffin & Tranter, 1986
Leptomithrax Miers, 1876
Maiopsis Faxon, 1893
Maja Lamarck, 1801
Majella Ortmann, 1893
Microhalimus Haswell, 1880
Naxia Latreille, 1825
Notomithrax Griffin, 1963
Paraentomonyx T. Sakai, 1983
Paramithrax H. Milne-Edwards, 1837
Pippacirama Griffin & Tranter, 1986
Prismatopus Ward, 1933
Schizophroida T. Sakai, 1933
Schizophrys White, 1848
Seiitaoides Griffin & Tranter, 1986
Temnonotus A. Milne-Edwards, 1875
Teratomaia Griffin & Tranter, 1986
Thersandrus Rathbun, 1897
Tumulosternum McCulloch, 1913
Wilsonimaia † Blow & Manning, 1996
Micromaiinae † Beurlen, 1930
Micromaia † Bittner, 1875
Mithracia † Bell, 1858
Pisomaja † Lőrenthey, in Lőrenthey & Beurlen, 1929
Mithracinae MacLeay, 1838
Ala Lockington, 1877
Antarctomithrax † Feldmann, 1994
Coelocerus A. Milne-Edwards, 1875
Cyclocoeloma Miers, 1880
Cyphocarcinus A. Milne-Edwards, 1868
Leptopisa Stimpson, 1871
Macrocoeloma Miers, 1879
Micippa Leach, 1817
Microphrys Milne-Edwards, 1851
Mithraculus White, 1847
Mithrax A. G. Desmarest, 1823
Nemausa A. Milne-Edwards, 1875
Paranaxia Rathbun, 1924
Picroceroides Miers, 1886
Stenocionops A. G. Desmarest, 1823
Teleophrys Stimpson, 1860
Thoe Bell, 1836
Tiarinia Dana, 1851
Planoterginae Števčić, 1991
Hemus A. Milne-Edwards, 1875
Planotergum Balss, 1935

References

External links

Majoidea
Decapod families
Taxa named by George Samouelle